KTHX-FM (94.5 MHz) is a commercial radio station broadcasting a Regional Mexican format. Licensed to Sun Valley, Nevada, it serves the Reno metropolitan area and Lake Tahoe. The station is owned and operated by Lotus Communications. The radio studios are on Plumb Lane in South Reno.

KTHX-FM has an effective radiated power (ERP) of 50,000 watts. The transmitter is located off McGuffrey Road on Red Hill in North Reno.  Programming is also heard on a 99 watt FM translator, K232EA at 94.3 MHz in Carson City, Nevada.

History
The station signed on the air in 1999 as KHXR. In 2004, it changed its call sign to KUUB.

On September 13, 2010, KUUB changed its format from country music to sports with programming from ESPN Radio. On October 5, 2021, the station changed its call sign from KUUB to KTHX-FM. Its sister station on 100.1 MHz, KWEE, had previously used the KTHX-FM call letters from 1997 to October 2021.

On February 6, 2023, KTHX-FM changed their format from sports to Regional Mexican, branded as "Que Buena 94.5".

Networks
KTHX-FM serves as the flagship radio station for the University of Nevada, Reno's athletic teams and the Nevada Wolf Pack Sports Network.

KTHX-FM broadcasts Las Vegas Raiders NFL games as the Reno affiliate for the Raiders Radio Network.

Previous logo

References

External links

1999 establishments in Nevada
Lotus Communications stations
Nevada Wolf Pack football
Radio stations established in 1999
THX-FM
Regional Mexican radio stations in the United States